The Miss Woodford Stakes is an American Thoroughbred horse race usually run each year in August at Monmouth Park Racetrack in Oceanport, New Jersey open to three-year-old fillies.  An ungraded stakes currently offering a current purse of $75,000, it is a sprint race contested over a distance of six furlongs on the dirt.

Added to Monmouth Park's stakes schedule in 1952, the race is named for the great racing mare Miss Woodford of the late 19th century who was inducted into the National Museum of Racing and Hall of Fame in 1967. It was at Monmouth in the old Monmouth Oaks that Miss Woodford ran the race that made her the highest earning racehorse of her time. Fellow U.S. Racing Hall of Fame inductees Tosmah (1964) and  Ta Wee (1969) won this race.

The Miss Woodford stakes was run in two divisions in 1967 and again in 1986.

Records
Speed  record:
 1:08.60 – Ta Wee (1969)

Most wins by a jockey:
 4 – Craig Perret (1983, 1986 (2×), 1991)

Most wins by a trainer:
 2 – MacKenzie Miller (1959, 1970)
 2 – "Sunny" Jim Fitzsimmons (1962, 1963)
 2 – Anthony J. Bardaro (1974, 1978)
 2 – Warren A. Croll Jr. (1975, 1977)
 2 – Robert W. Camac (1984, 1987)

Most wins by an owner:
 2 – Darby Dan Farm (1954, 1961)
 2 – Wheatley Stable (1962, 1963)
 2 – Bright View Farm (1974, 1978)
 2 – Raymond Dweck (1997, 2001)

Winners

References
 The Miss Woodford Stakes at Pedigree query

Ungraded stakes races in the United States
Horse races in New Jersey
Sprint category horse races for fillies and mares
Horse races established in 1952
Monmouth Park Racetrack